Qamar Ajnalvi (قمر اجنالوی), born Abdus Sattar (July 1919 – 30 May 1993), was a Pakistani novelist who wrote in the Urdu language. He was born in Ajnala, Amritsar district, British India. He was the only son of his father, Din Muhammad. He moved to Lahore in 1940. He wrote his first historical novel, Shaheed Pujaran, in 1938. Qamar Ajnalvi was married to Begum Amtul Hafeez on 31 December 1944. They had a son together.

Works
He also wrote several Pakistani Urdu movie scripts which include: Maan Baap, Laila Majnoo, Buzdil, Dillan wich Rab wasda, and Mein Ney Kia Jurm Kia. He also wrote dialogue for the movie Anarkali and several others. His famous historical novels include: Shaheed Pujaran, Maarka Panipat, Inqlab-e-Turki, 
Baghi Sardar,
Parthal,
Ghazala,
Urkhan-ul-Ghazi,
Sultan,
Wali Ehad,
Jang-e-Muqaddas,
Pandarey,
Muqaddas Moorti,
Chah-e-Babul,
Baghdad Ki Raat,
Lala-Rukh, and 
Dharti Ka Safar.

He also wrote a novel on world politics, Jahan-e-loh-o-qalam.

References

1919 births
1993 deaths
People from Amritsar district
Writers from Lahore
Pakistani expatriates in Germany